Rocca San Felice is a town and comune in the province of Avellino, Campania, southern Italy.

Geography
Located in the central area of Irpinia, the municipality borders with Frigento, Guardia Lombardi, Sant'Angelo dei Lombardi, Sturno and Villamaina. It counts no hamlets (frazioni) but some localities as Carmasciano, Fontana dell'Olmo, Palombaia, Santa Felicita, Serro del Bosco, Taverna Bruciata, Toriello and Valli.

Main sights
Among the main sights of the town there is the Castle and the old town, the Church of St. Maria Maggiore, the Chapel of Mary of Constantinople and the Sanctuary of Santa Felicita, in the homonymous locality.

Mefitis

The archaeological site of Ansanto Valley (Valle d'Ansanto), better known as "Mefite", is a sulphurous lake valley, few kilometres from the towns of Villamaina and Torella dei Lombardi. It was named after the ancient Italic goddess Mefitis, venerated by the people of Hirpini, and counts some ruins of a sanctuary of the 7th century BC. Because of this poisonous emissions, the surrounding area is free of animals and vegetation.

References

External links

 Official website 
 Info portal of Rocca San Felice 

Cities and towns in Campania
Archaeological sites in Campania